Amity is an unincorporated community in Knox County, in the U.S. state of Ohio.

History
Amity originally was called Emmettsville, and under the latter name was laid out in 1832. The new name of Amity was adopted around 1837. The post office at Amity was called Democracy. The Democracy post office was established in 1834, and remained in operation until 1923.

References

Unincorporated communities in Knox County, Ohio
1832 establishments in Ohio
Populated places established in 1832
Unincorporated communities in Ohio